Meadow Brook Steeplechase Association was a racing group on Long Island created on May 1, 1897. In 1914 their race was held on the property of Harry Payne Whitney.

References

1897 establishments in New York (state)
Steeplechase (horse racing)
Organizations established in 1897
Long Island